Jalgasbay Berdimuratov (born 27 March 1997) is an Uzbekistani Greco-Roman wrestler. He is a two-time medalist at the World Wrestling Championships. He is a three-time medalist, including gold, at the Asian Wrestling Championships. He is also a gold medalist at the 2021 Islamic Solidarity Games.

Career 

He won one of the bronze medals in the 77 kg at the 2019 World Wrestling Championships held in Nur-Sultan, Kazakhstan. He represented Uzbekistan at the 2020 Summer Olympics in Tokyo, Japan. He competed in the men's 77 kg event where he was eliminated in his first match.

In 2021, he won the gold medal in his event at the Wladyslaw Pytlasinski Cup held in Warsaw, Poland.

He won the silver medal in his event at the 2022 Asian Wrestling Championships held in Ulaanbaatar, Mongolia. He won the gold medal in his event at the 2021 Islamic Solidarity Games held in Konya, Turkey.

Achievements

References

External links 
 
 
 

1997 births
Living people
Place of birth missing (living people)
Uzbekistani male sport wrestlers
World Wrestling Championships medalists
Asian Wrestling Championships medalists
Olympic wrestlers of Uzbekistan
Wrestlers at the 2020 Summer Olympics
Islamic Solidarity Games medalists in wrestling
Islamic Solidarity Games competitors for Uzbekistan
21st-century Uzbekistani people